Rohilkhand Medical College and Hospital, established in 2006, is a full-fledged tertiary private Medical college and hospital. It is located at Bareilly in Uttar Pradesh. The college imparts the degree of Bachelor of Medicine and Surgery (MBBS) as well as specialized and post-doctoral degrees. Nursing and para-medical courses are also offered. The yearly undergraduate student intake is 250.

Courses
Rohilkhand Medical College and Hospital undertakes education and training of students in MBBS & post graduate courses.

Affiliated
The college is affiliated with Bareilly International University and is recognized by the National Medical Commission.

References

Medical colleges in Uttar Pradesh
Educational institutions established in 2006
2006 establishments in Uttar Pradesh